Albert Deane Grover (February 18, 1865 Boston, Massachusetts – October 23, 1927 Manhattan, New York) was an American banjoist, composer, teacher, and prolific inventor of musical parts and accessories for stringed instruments. He was a founding member of the Boston Ideal Banjo, Mandolin and Guitar Club. Grover held over 50 patents for musical instrument parts, and founded the musical accessories company A. D. Grover & Son. His father, Stephen Grover (1820–1885), was a Boston piano maker.

In 1952, Grover Musical Products, Inc., of Cleveland, Ohio, succeeded A.D. Grover & Son.

Selected compositions 
 Magog Quickstep, composed by Grover, Boston: Thompson & Odell (1887) 
 Marguerite Waltz, composed by Grover, Boston: Thompson & Odell (1889)

Other publications
 Grover's Progressive Method for the Banjo, Boston: Thompson & Odell Company (1892)

See also
 Machine head

References

External links
 The Maverick schottische / by A. D. Grover. 

1865 births
1927 deaths
American banjoists
American male composers
Musicians from Boston